Wisteriopsis japonica is a species of flowering plant in the family Fabaceae, native to Japan, Korea, and the Ryukyu Islands. It was first described in 1839 as Wisteria japonica. (The English name Japanese wisteria is used for a different species, Wisteria floribunda.)

Varieties
Two varieties have been recognized:
W. japonica var. alborosea – standard petal white, wing and keel petals pink
W. japonica var. japonica – all petals similarly coloured, yellowish to greenish white

References

Wisterieae
Flora of Japan
Flora of Korea
Flora of the Ryukyu Islands
Plants described in 1839